The Förderpreis für Literatur der Landeshauptstadt Düsseldorf is a German literary award donated by the City of Düsseldorf in Northrhine-Westphalia. The Prize for Literature in support of the City of Düsseldorf is awarded since 1972 by the Council of the City due to the decisions of the courts.

Prize money 
The Prize is endowed with 4,000 euros.

Award criteria 
The Förderpreis für Literatur der Landeshauptstadt Düsseldorf is given once a year to artists and groups, especially to the areas of Poetry, Writing, Review and Translation. The Prize is given either to a single artistic achievement as well as the existing overall performance of a young artist.

The female winner should generally not be older than 40 years, the male winner no older than 35 years. A further award of the Prize to the same artist is allowed if there is a minimum period of five years between the ceremonies.

Winners 
 2018:	Tobias Steinfeld, author
 2017:	Marlene Röder, author
 2016:	Lea Beiermann, author
 2015:	Dorian Steinhoff, author
 2014:	David Finck, author
 2013: Hannah Dübgen, author
 2012: Axel von Ernst, author
 2011: Philip Holstein, critics
 2010: Vera Elizabeth Gerling, translator
 2009: Alexander Conrad, author and translator
 2008: Reglindis Rauca, author
 2007: Pia Helfferich, author
 2006: Sabine Klewe, writer
 2005: Angela Litschev, poet
 2004: Peter Philipp †, writer
 2003: Frank Schablewski, author
 2002: Philip Schiemann, author
 2001: Martin Baltscheit, author
 2000: Silvia Kaffke, author
 1999: Pamela Granderath, author
 1998: Alexander Nitzberg, author
 1997: Saskia Fischer, author
 1996: Barbara Bongartz, author
 1995: Thomas Hoeps, author / poet
 1994: Caroline Ebner actress / Wolfram Goertz, critics
 1993: Peter Bamler, actor / Karin Beier, director
 1992: Kai Butcher, writer / André † Ronca, writer
 1991: Isabell Lawrence, translator / VEV- cabaret
 1990: Jens Berthold †, actor
 1989: Daniela El Aidi, mime / Kajo Scholz †, poet
 1988: Claudia Schaller, writer / Hubert Winkels, author and journalist
 1987: Barbara Zimmermann, children's book author / Heinz-Norbert Jocks, journalist
 1986: Georg Heinzen, Uwe Koch, authors / Thomas Kling †, author
 1985: Liane Dirks, writer / Ulrich Matthes, actor
 1984: Helga Lippelt, writer / Arpad Kraupa, actor
 1983: Krista Posch, actress / Anton Bachleitner, officials
 1982: Jhawemirc Theatre Group / Raimund Hoghe, writer
 1981: Bernd Schultze actor / Dorothée Haese Ling, writer
 1980: Mark Völlenklee, actor / Detlef Wolters, writer
 1979: Doris Wolf, amateur theater "stage 79" / Jens Prüss, writer
 1978: Charlotte Schwab, actress / Wolfgang Weck †, writer
 1977: Peter K. Kirchhof, writer / Udo Samel, actor
 1976: Jutta Hahn, actress / Niklas Stiller, writer
 1975: Gerhild Didusch, actress / Winfried Zangerle †, puppeteers
 1974: Marianne Hoika, actress / Barbara Ming Mandok, writer
 1973: Ilse Ritter, actress / Stobbe born Karin Struck, writer
 1972: Ferdinand Kriwet, writer / Wolf Seesemann, director

Literature 
 Förderpreis für Literatur der Landeshauptstadt Düsseldorf. In: Kürschners Deutscher Literatur-Kalender 2010/2011: Band I: A-O. Band II: P-Z., Walter De Gruyter Incorporated, 2010, P. 1427

References

External links 
 Förderpreis für Literatur der Landeshauptstadt Düsseldorf

Awards established in 1972
Young adult literature awards
German literary awards
Culture in Düsseldorf
1972 establishments in Germany